Matthew or Matt Chandler may refer to:

Matt Chandler (pastor) (born 1974), Southern Baptist pastor
Matt Chandler (writer) (born 1972), American author